Marcin Narwojsz (born 25 May 1976 in Lublin) is a retired Polish footballer.

References

External links
 

Polish footballers
Chrobry Głogów players
Zagłębie Lubin players
Ruch Chorzów players
Górnik Polkowice players
Polar Wrocław players
Ruch Wysokie Mazowieckie players
GKS Jastrzębie players
Hetman Zamość players
Sportspeople from Lublin
1976 births
Living people
Association football forwards